Strip! Strip! Hooray!!! is a 1932 British short comedy film directed by Norman Lee and starring Ken Douglas, Betty Norton and Albert E. Raynor. It was made by British International Pictures at Elstree Studios as a second feature.

Premise
A specialist sunbathing camp is threatened by a campaign by the leader of the 'Wear More Clothes League'.

Cast
 Ken Douglas as Benny Clements  
 Betty Norton as Janet  
 Albert E. Raynor as Sir Hector  
 Muriel White as Snowdrop  
 Hal Gordon as Hoodlum  
 June Seymour as Dance Band Leader 
 Binnie Barnes as Spanish Lady  
 Muriel Aked as Bit Part  
 Freddie Bartholomew as Boy  
 Charles Castella as Superintendent  
 Eric Pavitt as Boy 
 Anita Sharp-Bolster as Bit Part

References

Bibliography
 Chibnall, Steve. Quota Quickies: The Birth of the British 'B' Film. British Film Institute, 2007.

External links

1932 films
1932 comedy films
Films shot at British International Pictures Studios
Films directed by Norman Lee
Films set in England
British black-and-white films
British comedy short films
1930s English-language films
1930s British films